The 1962–63 Scottish Cup was the 78th staging of Scotland's most prestigious football knockout competition. The Cup was won by Rangers who defeated Celtic in the replayed final. The first round tie between Airdrie and Stranraer is notable for having been rearranged no fewer than 33 times due to inclement weather during the winter of 1962–63 in the United Kingdom.

First round

Second round

Replays

Second Replays

Third round

Replays

Quarter-finals

Replays

Second Replays

Semi-finals

Final 

Teams

Replay 

Teams

See also 
 1962–63 in Scottish football
 1962–63 Scottish League Cup

References

External links
 Video highlights (colour) from official Pathé News archive (first match)
 Video clip of the final (black and white) by Pathé News (replay)

Scottish Cup seasons
1962–63 in Scottish football
Scot